The Pontiac Pacific Junction Railway Company (PPJR) was a Canadian railway that operated in the upper Ottawa River valley in western Quebec and northeastern Ontario, Canada.

The railway ran from Aylmer through Quyon, Shawville, Fort Coulonge, and Waltham to Pembroke, Ontario.

As an important supplier of wood to the railroad industry, the Montreal Northern Colonization Railroad Company's decision to install a part of the Trans-Canada Railroad in Pontiac made sense. To guarantee the laying of the rails, Pontiac had to purchase $150 000 worth of shares, which was an enormous amount of money in that era. Council adopted the motion and when bad luck struck the firm and it collapsed under suspicious circumstances, Pontiac was released from its obligation.
The provincial government took possession of the railway, and promised Pontiac a railroad. The PPJR was incorporated in 1880 and merged with the Ottawa Northern and Western Railway in 1903. It was the first Canadian railway to light cars using acetylene.

Pontiac Council was once again asked for a contribution of $100,000 for the construction of the line. Since the railroads of that era depended exclusively on public funds, the question had to be voted on and validated by the majority of voices. The evident advantages of a railroad might give the impression that the vote would be easily won. However, this didn't happen. The construction of the PPJ happened in a troubled atmosphere. The population was divided, even in families. The opposition won the first part of the fight, but for all that, the promoters didn't admit defeat. The Council was reunited in September after the farmers who had opposed the project were gone out to the woods. Now that the influence of those opposing the project was reduced, the vote was favourable! It is not surprising that the mention of the railroad continued to anger some people for years.
However, there was more bad luck to come. In 1884 Pontiac was opposed to covering the interest on the $100,000 bonds. Suddenly realizing the impact of such a levy on a sparsely populated region, the Council decided not to honour its contract under the pretence that the PPJ hadn't respected its obligations. The Pontiac Pacific Junction, or the "Push, Pull, and Jerk" as locals affectionately called it, appealed to London's Privy Council, which concluded that Pontiac's claims were unfounded and that the region was therefore obligated to respect the clauses of the contract. The PPJ had just made a bitter enemy, but it had won.

Its infamous nickname was Push, Pull and Jerk and the " Poor People's Journey ". It is said that there were three classes of passengers: first class passengers stayed on the train, second class passengers walked, and third class passengers got out and helped push the train up the grades.

Taken over by Canadian Pacific in 1902, the Waltham subdivision was a busy and profitable line. But passengers inevitably declined with the improvement of roads and the growing popularity of automobiles. The two daily passenger trains became one and in 1955, it combined passengers and cargo. The line was discontinued in 1959. However, the line was still essential to Hilton's iron mine in Bristol. It wasn't until 1977 when the Bristol mine closed that rail service ended in Pontiac. 
Freight service followed suit in the 1980s. In 1984, less than 100 years after its construction, the railroad was dismantled from Wyman to Waltham and later turned into a linear park or bicycle trail the Cycloparc PPJ rail trail stretching from Bristol, Quebec, to Pembroke, Ontario. The line between Wyman and Aylmer met the same fate in 1987.

See also

 List of Ontario railways
 List of defunct Canadian railways

References

Defunct Quebec railways
Defunct Ontario railways
Transport in Outaouais
Pontiac Regional County Municipality
Rail transport in Renfrew County
Pembroke, Ontario
Railway lines closed in 1987